The General Cup was a professional non-ranking snooker tournament which was held sporadically from 2004 until 2015 at the General Snooker Club in Hong Kong.

History
Established in 2004 under the "General Cup International" name, the tournament was contested only intermittently, with the last event held in 2015. The field comprised mostly professional players and several top Far Eastern amateurs, except in 2013 only professionals were invited.

In 2014, there were eight professionals and a wildcard player. In the early rounds, the field of competition is divided into groups with the players in each group playing each other in a round-robin format, followed by knock-out stages. The final champion is Marco Fu.

Winners

References

 
Snooker non-ranking competitions
International sports competitions hosted by Hong Kong
Recurring sporting events established in 2004
2004 establishments in Hong Kong
Recurring sporting events disestablished in 2015
2015 disestablishments in Hong Kong
Cue sports in Hong Kong